The English Foxhound is one of the four foxhound breeds of dog. It is a cousin of the American Foxhound. They are scent hounds, bred to hunt foxes by scent.

Description

Appearance 

The skull is thick and the muzzle is long. The legs are muscular, straight-boned, and the paws are rounded, almost cat-like. The English Foxhound comes in any hound color, most often tricolor, tan, red, or black with a white base.

Temperament 

The English Foxhound is a pack hound, therefore, it gets along well with other dogs and enjoys human companionship. It gets along with horses, children, and other pets, as it is a gentle, social, and tolerant breed. It is an active breed that enjoys tracking foxes and has the stamina to run all day with few breaks.

Health and lifespan 
There are very few health problems in this breed. Occasionally seen are chronic hip dysplasia, renal disease, and epilepsy. The breed's lifespan is typically 10–13 years.

History 

The English Foxhound has been bred for over two hundred years, with the stud books dating back before 1800.

During the British Raj, English Foxhounds were exported to India for the purpose of jackal coursing, though due to the comparatively hotter weather, they were rarely long lived. Foxhounds were preferred for this purpose over greyhounds, as the former was not as fast, and could thus provide a longer, more sporting chase.

Studbooks for the English foxhound have been kept since the 18th century. Breeding lines and the work of people involved in breeding hounds is extremely important in the continual development of this working breed. Puppy shows are important events in the hunting calendar and allow the local hunt followers and visiting hound breeders to examine the latest generation from the hound pack. The International Foxhound Association was created in 2012 for the international promotion of the English Foxhound as a breed.

See also
 Dogs portal
 List of dog breeds

References

External links 

 

Dog breeds originating in England
FCI breeds
Rare dog breeds
Scent hounds